Belinda Jay Panelo is a Filipino American actress and former commercial model who became an MTV VJ after winning the MTV VJ Hunt in 1999, along with K. C. Montero. She is the daughter of U.S. vet, Salvador Sauza Panelo (not to be confused with the Filipino lawyer with same name). She made her mark in MTV as one of the funniest and wackiest MTV VJs ever, especially in her regular shows Classic MTV and MTV Mush.

Personal life

Belinda left MTV in 2003 and has since married her longtime boyfriend, tennis player Joseph Lizardo, whom she has a child with. The family relocated to New York, NY. In February 2019, she was the target of a racist rant.

Notes

External links
Belinda article on inq7.net

References

VJs (media personalities)
American actresses of Filipino descent
American female models
American expatriates in the Philippines
Filipino female models
Participants in Philippine reality television series
Living people
1974 births
Star Magic
21st-century American women